This is a list of round winners and playoff matches in the regionally organized Eccellenza 2005/2006.

Like the 2011–12 season, there were 48 groups into 9 squads a one.

Division winners

* a second team promoted via playoffs – see below

Regional playoffs
Note: Eccellenza Liguria, Trentino-Alto Adige/Südtirol, Veneto, Friuli-Venezia Giulia, Emilia-Romagna, Lazio, Basilicata and Sardinia did not organize any regional playoff, but admitted directly the second-placed team to the national phase.
A special tiebreaker playoff was held in Eccellenza Veneto B, as the second and the third placed teams ended the regular season with the same points.

Piedmont A

4th-place Tie-breaker

|}

Playoff semifinals

|}
Playoff finals

|}

Piedmont B

Playoff semifinals

|}
Playoff finals

|}

Lombardy A

5th-Place Tiebreaker

|}
Playoff semifinals

|}
Playoff final

|}

Lombardy B

Playoff semifinals

|}
Playoff final

|}

Lombardy C

Playoff semifinals

|}
Playoff final

|}

Veneto B

Playoff

|}

Tuscany A

Playoff semifinals

|}
Playoff final

|}

Tuscany B

Playoff semifinals

|}
Playoff final

|}

Umbria

Playoff semifinals

|}
Playoff final

|}

Marche

Playoff semifinals

|}
Playoff final

|}

Abruzzo

Playoff semifinals

|}
Playoff final

|}

Molise

Playoff semifinals

|}
Playoff final

|}

Campania A

Playoff semifinals

|}
Playoff final

|}

Campania B

Playoff semifinals

|}
Playoff final

|}

Apulia

Playoff semifinals

|}
Playoff final

|}

Calabria

Playoff semifinals

|}
Playoff final

|}

Sicily A

Playoff semifinals

|}
Playoff final

|}

Sicily B

Playoff semifinals

|}
Playoff final

|}

(b) — Team who best placed in the regular season qualifies for the next round.

National playoffs

First round

|}

Second round

|}

Promoted teams

Coppa Italia Dilettanti
2005/2006 Final: Esperia Viareggio (Tuscany – A) 2:0 Real Ippogrifo (Campania – B)

Since Esperia Viareggio won its Eccellenza division, being therefore already promoted, Real Ippogrifo is automatically promoted to Serie D.

References

RSSSF: Italy Sixth Level 2005/06

6
2006